Luís A. N. Amaral (born 12 July 1968) is a Portuguese physicist recognized for his research in complex systems and complex networks. His specific research interests include the emergence, evolution, and stability of complex social and biological systems. He is best known for his work in network classification and cartographic methods for uncovering the organization of complex networks. He is currently professor at McCormick School of Engineering and Feinberg School of Medicine, Northwestern University.

Education 

Amaral received both his bachelor's and master's degrees in Physics from the University of Lisbon in 1990 and 1992, respectively. He then went to Boston where he performed his doctoral work under the supervision of H. Eugene Stanley at Boston University, and received his doctoral degree in 1996. He was a post-doctoral researcher at Forschungszentrum Jülich, MIT, Boston University, and Harvard Medical School. In 2002, he became a professor at Northwestern University.

Academic career 

Amaral has published over one hundred fifty scientific peer-reviewed papers in leading scientific journals, with more than twelve thousand citations. His research has been featured in many media sources. He is currently editor of several academic journals including Journal of Statistical Mechanics: Theory and Experiment and PLoS ONE. He also serves as the Graduate Program Director at the Department of Chemical Engineering at Northwestern University. He will become the co-director of Northwestern Institute on Complex Systems (NICO) in the fall of 2013.

Entrepreneurship 

Amaral is the co-founder and Scientific Advisor of Chimu Solutions, Inc. The company's main product, Footballrrating.com, tracks the performance of soccer teams and individual players. The technique is based on a paper co-authored by Amaral and the other co-founder of the company, Jordi Duch.

Personal life 

Professor Amaral currently lives in the city of Evanston with his wife and his two sons, Jordi and Ferran. Apart from science, he is interested in food and history. He is also an avid soccer fan, particularly for the Portugal national soccer team and Sport Lisboa e Benfica.

Awards and honors
 Fellow, American Physical Society (2014)
 Fellow, American Association for the Advancement of Science (2012)
 Invited Participant in NAE Japan-American Frontiers of Engineerium Symposium, National Academy of Engineering (2009)
 Member of Advisory Board on "Complex Systems", James S. McDonnell Foundation (2009)
 Early Career Scientist, Howard Hughes Medical Institute (2009)
 Invited Participant, NA-Keck Futures Initiative on Complex Systems, National Academies and W. M. Keck Foundation (2008)
 Distinguished Young Scholar in Medical Research, W. M. Keck Foundation (2006)
 Invited Participant on Workshop on Transformative Research, National Science Board (2005)
 Invited speaker at German-American Frontiers of Science Symposium, National Academy of Sciences and Humboldt Foundation (2005)
 Organizer, 11th Annual Frontiers of Engineering Symposium, National Academy of Engineering (2005)
 K-25 Career Award, NIGMS/NIH (2004)
 Invited participant in 10th Annual Frontiers of Engineering Symposium, National Academy of Engineering (2004)
 Invited participant in 9th Annual Frontiers of Engineering Symposium, National Academy of Engineering (2003)
 Searle Leadership Fund Award, Northwestern University (2002)
 Postdoctoral Fellowship (2 years), Fundação para a Ciência e Tecnologia, Portugal (1997)
 Postdoctoral Fellowship (15 months), DFG, Germany (1995)
 Pre-doctoral Fellowship (3 years), JNICT, Portugal (1992)
 Pre-doctoral Masters Fellowship (2 years), JNICT, Portugal (1990)
 Scholarship (10 years), Fundação Calouste Gulbenkian, Portugal (1981)

Selected publications

Notes

External links 
 Amaral Lab website
 Department website profile
 Chimu Solutions, Inc.

Complex systems scientists
Boston University alumni
Portuguese academics
Portuguese scientists
Northwestern University faculty
University of Lisbon alumni
Living people

1968 births
Network scientists